Sparekassen Thy Arena Mors is an indoor sports arena in Nykøbing Mors, Denmark primarily used for handball. The arena was built in 2008, and is home to Danish Handball League side Mors-Thy Håndbold.

Notes

Handball venues in Denmark
Indoor arenas in Denmark
Sports venues completed in 2008